In the run-up to the United Kingdom general elections, various organisations carry out opinion polling to gauge voting intention. Results of such polls are displayed in this article.

The date range for these opinion polls are from the general election until the general election.

Polling results 

All data is from PollBase

1951

1950

References 

Opinion polling for United Kingdom general elections